Southern Germany is a region of Germany that included the areas in which Upper German dialects are spoken, which includes the stem duchies of Bavaria and Swabia (present-day Bavaria, Baden-Württemberg, and the southern portion of Hesse and Rhineland-Palatinate that were part of the Duchy of Franconia).

German-speaking Switzerland, Austria, Liechtenstein, and South Tyrol are historically, culturally, and linguistically part of the region.

Boundaries
Southern Germany primarily contrasts with Northern Germany and defines the territories of modern Germany that did not form part of the North German Confederation in the 19th century. Between Northern and Southern Germany is the loosely defined area known as Central Germany (Mitteldeutschland), roughly corresponding to the areal of Central German dialects (Franconia, Thuringia, Saxony).

The boundary between the spheres of political influence of Prussia (Northern Germany) and Austria (Southern Germany)  within the German Confederation (1815–1866) was known as the "Main line" (Mainlinie, after the river Main), Frankfurt am Main being the seat of the federal assembly. The "Main line" did not follow the course of the River Main upstream of Frankfurt, however, it instead corresponded to the northern border of the Kingdom of Bavaria.

Linguistically, Southern Germany corresponds to the Upper German dialects. Southern Germany is culturally and linguistically more similar to German-speaking Switzerland, Austria, and German-speaking South Tyrol than to Central and Northern Germany. A jocular term referring to a cultural boundary defining Bavarian culture is Weißwurstäquator, i.e. the "equator" dividing Northern Germany from the homeland of the Weißwurst sausage.

Geography 

The river Main, flowing westward, through Upper and Lower Franconia and Southern Hesse, through the city of Frankfurt, into the river Rhine at Mainz, is often cited as a natural border between Southern and Middle Germany while the border west of Mainz is, in that respect, less clearly determined. The border between the Palatinate and the Rhineland—roughly a line between Bonn and Bingen, in the mountain ranges (Mittelgebirge) of the Westerwald, the Taunus, and the Eifel, along the Rhine and Mosel rivers—is seen as the cultural border between Southern and Western Germany.

Population 

Two of the most populous states of Germany, Baden-Württemberg and Bavaria, are part of Southern Germany. They have a combined population of 23.5 million people. In the broader sense (with Rhineland-Palatinate and the Saarland), Southern Germany includes roughly 30 million people. Thus, about 40% of the German population and almost 30% of all native speakers of the German language live there.

The region has a Catholic majority, but also a significant Lutheran Protestant population (especially in northern Württemberg and some parts of Baden and Franconia (northern Bavaria)), in contrast to the almost entirely Protestant Northern Germany. Due to the immigration of non-Christians, mainly Turks (see Turks in Germany) during the last decades of the twentieth century, there is also a small number (roughly 250,000, i.e. 2-3% of the population) of Muslims.

Major cities  
Where a city has different names in English and German, the English name is given first.

Characteristics

Economically, Southern Germany is the strongest part of Germany, with Baden-Württemberg and Bavaria being the powerhouses of manufacturing, especially in the automobile and machinery industry. Furthermore, it is home to some of the country's most prestigious universities (such as the ones in Heidelberg, Munich, Tübingen, and Würzburg).

The specific features of the landscape are rolling hills, Mittelgebirge (mid-range mountains). Southern Germany also has a part of the Alps, in the southeast of the region (Allgäu and Bavarian Alps). In the culinary field, both beer and wine are produced in many varieties throughout the region. The regional cuisine consists of stews, sausages, cabbage, noodles, and other pasta dishes as well as a variety of holiday cookies, cakes, and tarts.

See also 

 Northern Germany
 Central Germany (geography), Central Germany (cultural area)
 Western Germany, Eastern Germany
 Weißwurstäquator
 Upper German
 Alemannic dialects
 Austro-Bavarian dialects
 East Franconian German
 South Franconian German

References
Handbook for Travellers in Southern Germany: Being a Guide to Wuertemberg, Bavaria, Austria, Tyrol, Salzburg, Styria, &c., the Austrian and Bavarian Alps, and the Danube from Ulm to the Black Sea, Murray's foreign handbooks, 1871

Regions of Germany